Sentry Box is a historic home located at Fredericksburg, Virginia. It was built in 1786, and is a large two-story, five-bay, Georgian style frame dwelling with Colonial Revival and Greek Revival-style details. It has a central-passage plan and side gable roof.  Also on the property is a contributing icehouse.

It was listed on the National Register of Historic Places in 1992.  It is located in the Fredericksburg Historic District.

References

External links
Sentry Box House, 133 Caroline Street, Fredericksburg, Fredericksburg, VA: 2 photos at Historic American Buildings Survey

Historic American Buildings Survey in Virginia
Houses on the National Register of Historic Places in Virginia
Georgian architecture in Virginia
Colonial Revival architecture in Virginia
Greek Revival houses in Virginia
Houses completed in 1786
Houses in Fredericksburg, Virginia
National Register of Historic Places in Fredericksburg, Virginia
Individually listed contributing properties to historic districts on the National Register in Virginia